Tuiharpalus gourlayi is a species of ground beetle in the family Carabidae. It is found in New Zealand.

References

Carabidae
Articles created by Qbugbot
Beetles described in 1964